The voiceless alveolar fricatives are a type of fricative consonant pronounced with the tip or blade of the tongue against the alveolar ridge (gum line) just behind the teeth. This refers to a class of sounds, not a single sound. There are at least six types with significant perceptual differences:
The voiceless alveolar sibilant  has a strong hissing sound, as the s in English sink. It is one of the most common sounds in the world.
The voiceless denti-alveolar sibilant  (an ad hoc notation), also called apico-dental, has a weaker lisping sound like English th in thin. It occurs in Spanish dialects in southern Spain (eastern Andalusia). 
The voiceless alveolar retracted sibilant [], and the subform apico-alveolar , or called grave, has a weak hushing sound reminiscent of  fricatives. It is used in the languages of northern Iberia, like Asturleonese, Basque, Castilian Spanish (excluding parts of Andalusia), Catalan, Galician, and Northern European Portuguese. A similar retracted sibilant form is also used in Dutch, Icelandic, some southern dialects of Swedish, Finnish, and Greek.
It occurs in Icelandic as well as an intervocalic and word-final allophone of English  in dialects such as Hiberno-English and Scouse.
The voiceless alveolar lateral fricative  sounds like a voiceless, strongly articulated version of English l (somewhat like what the English cluster **hl would sound like) and is written as ll in Welsh.

The first three types are sibilants, meaning that they are made by directing a stream of air with the tongue towards the teeth and have a piercing, perceptually prominent sound.

Voiceless alveolar sibilant

The voiceless alveolar sibilant is a common consonant sound in vocal languages. It has a characteristic high-pitched, highly perceptible hissing sound.

The voiceless alveolar sibilant  is one of the most common sounds cross-linguistically. If a language has fricatives, it will most likely have . In addition, sibilants are absent from Australian Aboriginal languages, in which fricatives are rare; even the few indigenous Australian languages that have fricatives do not have sibilants.

Voiceless apico-alveolar sibilant 

The voiceless alveolar retracted sibilant (commonly termed the voiceless apico-alveolar sibilant) is a fricative that is articulated with the tongue in a hollow shape, usually with the tip of the tongue (apex) against the alveolar ridge. It is a sibilant sound and is found most notably in a number of languages in a linguistic area covering northern and central Iberia. It is most well known from its occurrence in the Spanish of this area. In the Middle Ages, it occurred in a wider area, covering Romance languages spoken throughout France, Portugal, and Spain, as well as Old High German and Middle High German.

Occurrence in Europe

Modern 
In Romance languages, it occurs as the normal voiceless alveolar sibilant in Astur-Leonese, Castilian Spanish, Catalan, Galician, northern European Portuguese, and some Occitan dialects. It also occurs in Basque and Mirandese, where it is opposed to a different voiceless alveolar sibilant, the more common ; the same distinction occurs in a few dialects of northeastern Portuguese. Outside this area, it also occurs in a few dialects of Latin American Spanish (e.g. Antioqueño and Pastuso, in Colombia).

Amongst Germanic languages, it occurs in Dutch (and closely related Low German), Icelandic, many dialects in Scandinavia, and working-class Glaswegian English.

It also occurs in Modern Greek (with a  articulation), as well as the Baltic languages.

There is no single IPA symbol used for this sound. The symbol  is often used, with a diacritic indicating an  pronunciation. However, that is potentially problematic in that not all alveolar retracted sibilants are apical (see below), and not all apical alveolar sibilants are retracted.

Medieval 
In medieval times, it occurred in a wider area, including the Romance languages spoken in most or all of France and Iberia (Old Spanish, Galician-Portuguese, Catalan, French, etc.), as well as in the Old and Middle High German of central and southern Germany, and most likely Northern Germany as well. In all of these languages, the retracted "apico-alveolar" sibilant was opposed to a non-retracted sibilant much like modern English , and in many of them, both voiceless and voiced versions of both sounds occurred. The situation was similar in High German, where the retracted sibilants derived largely from Proto-Germanic , while the non-retracted sibilants derived from instances of Proto-Germanic  that were shifted by the High German sound shift. Minimal pairs were common in all languages. Examples in Middle High German, for example, were  "to know" (Old English , cf. "to wit") vs.  "known" (Old English ), and  "white" (Old English ) vs.  "way" (Old English , cf. "-wise").

Description of the retracted sibilant 
Often, to speakers of languages or dialects that do not have the sound, it is said to have a "whistling" quality, and to sound similar to palato-alveolar . This occurred, for example, in English borrowings from Old French (e.g. push from pousser, cash from caisse); in Polish borrowings from medieval German (e.g.  from kosten,  from sūr (contemporary )); and in representations of Mozarabic (an extinct medieval Romance language once spoken in southern Spain) in Arabic characters. The similarity between retracted  and  has resulted in many exchanges in Spanish between the sounds, during the medieval period when Spanish had both phonemes.

One of the clearest descriptions of this sound is from Obaid: "There is a Castilian s, which is a voiceless, concave, apicoalveolar fricative: The tip of the tongue turned upward forms a narrow opening against the alveoli of the upper incisors. It resembles a faint  and is found throughout much of the northern half of Spain".

Many dialects of Modern Greek have a very similar-sounding sibilant that is pronounced with a  articulation.

Loss of the voiceless alveolar sibilant 
This distinction has since vanished from most of the languages that once had it in medieval times.
 In most dialects of Spanish, the four alveolar sibilants have merged into the non-retracted  while distinguish in spelling.
 In the remaining dialects of Portuguese, found in northern Portugal, they merged into the retracted  , or, as in Mirandese (which is, however, not a Portuguese dialect, but belongs to Asturian-Leonese), conserved the medieval distinction.
 In central and northern Spanish, the non-retracted  was fronted to  after merging with non-retracted , while the retracted  remains.
The rules for these mergers differ between dialects. In Standard German,  is used stem-initially and sporadically after ‹r›. Especially in Alemannic, every pre-consonantal  became .

Loss-causing events 
Those languages in which the sound occurs typically did not have a phonological process from which either  or  appeared, two similar sounds with which ⟨s̺⟩ was eventually confused. In general, older European languages only had a single pronunciation of s.

 from a deaffricated  in Northern France and southern-central Portugal, as in French chat "cat", Portuguese achar "find".
In High German,  was reached through a  >  >  process, as in German Wasser compared to English water. In English, the same process of Romance  >  occurred in Norman-imported words, accounting for modern homophones sell and cell.  was also reached from a -sk- cluster reduction as in Romance, e.g. Old English spelling asc for modern ash, German schiff and English ship compared to Danish skib.

Exceptions 
Standard Modern Greek, which has apical , lacked both processes.

The Germanic-speaking regions that did not have either phenomenon have normally preserved the apical , that is, Icelandic, Dutch and many Scandinavian lects. It is also found in a minority of Low German dialects.

Galician, Catalan and Ladino changed only .

Reach in ancient times 
Because of the widespread medieval distribution, it has been speculated that retracted  was the normal pronunciation in spoken Latin. Certain borrowings suggest that it was not far off from the sh-sound , e.g. Aramaic Jeshua > Greek Ἰησοῦς (Iēsoûs) > Latin Jesus, Hebrew Shabbat > Latin sabbatum; but this could also be explained by the lack of a better sound in Latin to represent Semitic š. It equally well could have been an areal feature inherited from the prehistoric languages of Western Europe, as evidenced by its occurrence in modern Basque.

For the same reasons, it can be speculated that retracted  was the pronunciation of Proto-Germanic s. Its presence in many branches of Indo-European and its presence particularly in the more conservative languages inside each branch (e.g.

, but not , was developed in Italian. However, where Spanish and Catalan have apical , Italian uses the same laminal  that occurs in standard forms of English: evidence, it could be argued, that S was not pronounced apically in Latin.

Voiceless lamino-dental sibilant
A voiceless laminal dental or dentialveolar sibilant contrasts with a voiceless apical alveolar or post-alveolar sibilant in Basque and several languages of California, including Luiseño of the Uto-Aztecan family and Kumeyaay of the Yuman family.

Comparison between English and Spanish 
The term "voiceless alveolar sibilant" is potentially ambiguous in that it can refer to at least two different sounds. Various languages of northern Iberia (e.g., Astur-Leonese, Catalan, Basque, Galician, Portuguese and Spanish) have a so-called "voiceless apico-alveolar sibilant" that lacks the strong hissing of the  described in this article but has a duller, more "grave" sound quality somewhat reminiscent of a voiceless retroflex sibilant. Basque, Mirandese and some Portuguese dialects in northeast Portugal (as well as medieval Spanish and Portuguese in general) have both types of sounds in the same language.

There is no general agreement about what actual feature distinguishes these sounds. Also, Adams asserts that many dialects of Modern Greek have a laminal sibilant with a sound quality similar to the "apico-alveolar" sibilant of northern Iberia.

Some authors have instead suggested that the difference lies in tongue shape. Adams describes the northern Iberian sibilant as "retracted".

Features
Features of the voiceless alveolar sibilant:

 There are at least three specific variants of :
 Dentalized laminal alveolar (commonly called "dental"), which means it is articulated with the tongue blade very close to the upper front teeth, with the tongue tip resting behind lower front teeth.
 Non-retracted alveolar, which means it is articulated with either the tip or the blade of the tongue at the alveolar ridge, termed respectively apical and laminal. According to  about half of English speakers use a non-retracted apical articulation.
 Retracted alveolar, which means it is articulated with either the tip or the blade of the tongue slightly behind the alveolar ridge, termed respectively apical and laminal. Acoustically, it is close to laminal  or (to a lesser extent) .

Examples

Dentalized laminal alveolar

Non-retracted alveolar

Retracted alveolar

Variable

Voiceless alveolar non-sibilant fricative

The voiceless alveolar non-sibilant fricative (also known as a "slit" fricative) is a consonantal sound.

Some scholars also posit the voiceless alveolar approximant distinct from the fricative.

Few languages also have the voiceless alveolar tapped fricative, which is simply a very brief apical alveolar non-sibilant fricative, with the tongue making the gesture for a tapped stop but not making full contact. This can be indicated in the IPA with the lowering diacritic to show full occlusion did not occur.

Tapped fricatives are occasionally reported in the literature, though these claims are not generally independently confirmed and so remain dubious.

Flapped fricatives are theoretically possible but are not attested.

Features
 However, it does not have the grooved tongue and directed airflow, or the high frequencies, of a sibilant.

Occurrence

See also
 Voiceless corono-dentoalveolar sibilant
 Tongue shape
 Apical consonant
 Laminal consonant
 Index of phonetics articles

Notes

References

 
 
 
 
 
 
 
 
 
 
 
 
 
 
 

 
 
 
 
 
 
 
 
 
 
 
 
 
 
 
 
 
 
 
 
 
 
 
 
 
 
 
 Martin Harris and Nigel Vincent. The Romance Languages.

External links
 
 

Alveolar consonants
Fricative consonants
Voiceless oral consonants
Central consonants
Pulmonic consonants